Dean Crawford (born February 28, 1958, in Victoria, British Columbia) is a Canadian rower. He began rowing in 1978 and won a gold medal at the 1984 Summer Olympics in the men's eight event.

References
 Canadian Olympic Committee

1958 births
Living people
Olympic rowers of Canada
Canadian male rowers
Rowers at the 1984 Summer Olympics
Olympic gold medalists for Canada
Rowers from Victoria, British Columbia
Olympic medalists in rowing
Medalists at the 1984 Summer Olympics
20th-century Canadian people